Veturi (Telugu: వేటూరి) is one of the Indian surnames. People with this surname are Telugu Brahmins. The term Veturi comes from the place Veturu. Notable people with the surname include:

 Veturi Prabhakara Sastri (1888–1950), Sanskrit and Telugu pandit
 Veturi (1936–2010), Telugu cinema writer
Vikram Veturi Director

Indian surnames